Pomona is a city in Los Angeles County, California. Pomona is located in the Pomona Valley, between the Inland Empire and the San Gabriel Valley. At the 2020 census, the city's population was 151,713. The main campus of California State Polytechnic University, Pomona, also known as Cal Poly Pomona, lies partially within Pomona's city limits, with the rest being located in the neighboring unincorporated community of Ramona.

History

Beginnings to 1880

The area was originally occupied by the Tongva Native Americans.

The city is named after Pomona, the ancient Roman goddess of fruit. For horticulturist Solomon Gates, "Pomona" was the winning entry in a contest to name the city in 1875, before anyone had ever planted a fruit tree there. The city was first settled by Ricardo Véjar and Ygnacio Palomares in the 1830s, when California and much of the now-American Southwest were part of Mexico.

The first Anglo-Americans arrived prior to 1848 when the signing of the Treaty of Guadalupe Hidalgo resulted in California becoming part of the United States.  In 1864, the widow of Ygnacio Palomares of Rancho San José sold  to Louis Phillips, a Jewish Prussian immigrant, who would shortly be known as "the richest man in Los Angeles County." He built the largest commercial building in Los Angeles central business district at the time, the Phillips Block, which would eventually house Hamburger's, the then-largest department store in the Western United States.

Spadra

Phillips sold a parcel of his land to William "Uncle Billy" Rubottom, in 1866 who founded a new town there and named it Spadra after his hometown, now part of Clarksville, Arkansas. Spadra became a stagecoach stop, Rubottom built the Spadra Hotel and Tavern to serve travelers, and by 1870, Spadra had 400–500 residents, three stores, a school, and a post office. In 1873, Phillips convinced the Southern Pacific Railroad to build a line to Spadra. Phillips thought Spadra would become a great town, and built his Phillips Mansion there in 1875, which together with the Spadra Cemetery are the only two remnants of the town that still exist today. Fullerton's Main north–south road was named Spadra Road for its first 75 years, as long before the 57 Freeway it was the road through Brea Canyon to Spadra, and was later renamed Harbor Boulevard. The Southern Pacific Railroad had a terminus at Spadra, but the line was extended east to Colton, and Spadra lost momentum. In 1964, the area was annexed by Pomona.

1880-present

By the 1880s, the arrival of Coachella Valley water which, together with railroad access, made it the western anchor of the citrus-growing region. Pomona was officially incorporated on January 6, 1888.

In the 1920s Pomona was known as the "Queen of the Citrus Belt", with one of the highest per-capita levels of income in the United States.  In the 1940s it was used as a movie-previewing location for major motion picture studios to see how their films would play to modally middle-class audiences around the country (for which Pomona was at that time viewed as an idealized example).

Religious institutions are deeply embedded in the history of Pomona. There are now more than 120 churches, representing most religions in today's society. The historical architectural styles of these churches provide glimpses of European church design and architecture from other eras.

Pomona Mall was a downtown pedestrian mall, recognized by the Los Angeles Conservancy as an outstanding example of Mid-century modern and modern architecture and design. It was completed in 1962, one element in a larger plan of civic improvements covering the whole city. The eastern end is now part of the Western University of Health Sciences campus, while the western end now houses numerous art galleries, art studios and restaurants.

In 2005, Pomona citizens elected Norma Torres, the first woman of Guatemalan heritage to be elected to a mayoral post outside of Guatemala. Later, she would become a U.S. congresswoman representing California's 35th congressional district in 2015.

Geography

Pomona is bordered by the cities of San Dimas on the northwest, La Verne and Claremont on the north, Montclair and Chino on the east, Chino Hills and Diamond Bar on the south, Walnut, South San Jose Hills, and Industry on the southwest, and the unincorporated community of Ramona on the west. The Los Angeles/San Bernardino county line forms most of the city's southern and eastern boundaries.

Climate
Pomona has a Mediterranean climate (Köppen climate classification Csa) with hot, dry summers and mild, damp winters and a large amount of sunshine year-round. Summers are characterized by sunny days and very little rainfall during the months of June through September. Fall brings cooler temperatures and occasional showers, as well as seasonal Santa Ana winds originating from the northeast. Winter also brings the majority of annual precipitation. Snowfall is virtually unheard of, but frost can occur once or twice a year. Annual precipitation averages .

Architecture
The following structures in Pomona are noted by the Los Angeles Conservancy:
 Cal Poly Pomona College of Environmental Design  (1971, Carl Maston)
The Downtown Center / Lytton Savings (1964, Kurt Meyer & Associates)
Fox Theater Pomona (1931, Balch & Stanbery)
Pomona Mall (1962, Millard Sheets)
Pomona Civic Center (1969, Welton Becket & Associates)

Demographics
The most common ancestries in Pomona are German, English, Italian, Irish and French.

2010
The 2010 United States Census reported that Pomona had a population of 149,058, a slight decline from the 2000 census population. The racial makeup of Pomona was 71,564 (48.0%) White (12.5% Non-Hispanic White), 10,924 (7.3%) African American, 1,763 (1.2%) Native American, 12,688 (8.5%) Asian of which is Chinese	2,217	1.48%
Filipino	2,938	1.97%
Japanese	443	0.3%
Korean	633	0.42%
Vietnamese	1643	1.1%	, 282 (0.2%) Pacific Islander, 45,171 (30.3%) from other races, and 6,666 (4.5%) from two or more races. Hispanic or Latino of any race were 105,135 persons (70.5%).

The Census reported that 144,920 people (97.2% of the population) lived in households, 2,782 (1.9%) lived in non-institutionalized group quarters, and 1,356 (0.9%) were institutionalized.

There were 38,477 households, out of which 19,690 (51.2%) had children under the age of 18 living in them, 19,986 (51.9%) were opposite-sex married couples living together, 6,960 (18.1%) had a female householder with no husband present, 3,313 (8.6%) had a male householder with no wife present.  There were 2,823 (7.3%) unmarried opposite-sex partnerships, and 299 (0.8%) same-sex married couples or partnerships. 5,810 households (15.1%) were made up of individuals, and 2,010 (5.2%) had someone living alone who was 65 years of age or older. The average household size was 3.77.  There were 30,259 families (78.6% of all households); the average family size was 4.15.

The population was spread out, with 43,853 people (29.4%) under the age of 18, 20,155 people (13.5%) aged 18 to 24, 42,311 people (28.4%) aged 25 to 44, 31,369 people (21.0%) aged 45 to 64, and 11,370 people (7.6%) who were 65 years of age or older.  The median age was 29.5 years.  For every 100 females age 18 and over, there were 98.4 males.

The homeowner vacancy rate was 2.0%; the rental vacancy rate was 5.9%.  80,968 people (54.3% of the population) lived in owner-occupied housing units and 63,952 people (42.9%) lived in rental housing units

During 2009–2013, Pomona had a median household income of $49,474, with 21.6% of the population living below the federal poverty line.

Economy

Since the 1980s, Pomona's newest neighborhood Phillips Ranch, experienced rapid growth with homes still being built in the hilly area between Downtown and Diamond Bar.  Today, Phillips Ranch is nearly all residential. Northern Pomona has seen some gentrification with additional housing units added and revamped streetscapes. Pomona Electronics was originally based in the city.

Pomona had two malls, the pedestrian Pomona Mall downtown and the Indian Hill Mall, both now defunct as malls per se, but still dedicated to retail and other uses.

According to the city's 2018 Comprehensive Annual Financial Report, the top employers in the city and number of employees are Pomona Valley Hospital Medical Center (3,230), Pomona Unified School District (3,034), California State Polytechnic University, Pomona (2,440), Fairplex (1,071), Casa Colina Rehabilitation Center (1,020), City of Pomona (661), and County of Los Angeles Department of Social Services (350).

Arts and culture

Annual cultural events
The city is the site of the Fairplex, which hosts the L.A. County Fair and the Pomona Swap Meet & Classic Car Show. The swap meet (for car parts and accessories) is part of the car show, which is a single-day event held seven times throughout the year.

The city is also home to the NHRA Auto Club Raceway at Pomona (formerly the Pomona Raceway), which hosts Winternationals drag racing competition.

Museums and other points of interest

 dA Center for the Art
 Fairplex, annual Los Angeles County Fair
 Auto Club Raceway at Pomona (Pomona Raceway)
 Ygnacio Palomares Adobe, List of Registered Historic Places in Los Angeles County, California
 La Casa Primera de Rancho San Jose, List of Registered Historic Places in Los Angeles County, California - Pomona
 Pomona Envisions the Future mural in the Arts District of Pomona
 The Glass House
 Pomona Fox Theater
 Phillips Mansion
 Cal Poly Pomona
 American Museum of Ceramic Art
 RailGiants Train Museum
Pomona Ebell Museum of History
Spadra Cemetery

Government

Municipal government
Pomona was incorporated on January 6, 1888, and adopted a charter in 1911, making it a charter city.

The city is governed by a seven-member city council. Regular municipal elections are held on a Tuesday after the first Monday in November in even-numbered years. Councilmembers serve four-year terms, and the mayor is the presiding councilmember, elected at-large.  The other six members are elected by districts.  Every eight months, the council appoints a new vice mayor from among its members.

Mayor: Tim Sandoval

City Council members:
John Nolte (District One)
Victor Preciado (District Two)
Nora Garcia (District Three)
Elizabeth Ontiveros-Cole (District Four)
Steve Lustro (District Five)
Robert Torres (District Six)

City manager: James Makshanoff

City Commissions

Financial report
According to the city's most recent Comprehensive Annual Financial Report, the city's various funds had $220.3 million in revenues, $225.5 million in expenditures, $818.3 million in total assets, $520 million in total liabilities, and $80.6 million in cash and investments.

County representation
In the Los Angeles County Board of Supervisors, Pomona is in the 1st District, represented by Democrat Hilda Solis.

The Los Angeles County Department of Health Services operates the Pomona Health Center in Pomona.

The Los Angeles County Fire Department provides fire department services for Pomona on a contract basis.

State and federal representation

Education

Public and private schools
Most of Pomona and some of the surrounding area are served by the Pomona Unified School District. Pomona High School, Diamond Ranch High School, Ganesha High School, Garey High School, Fremont Academy, Palomares Academy, and Village Academy are PUSD's seven high schools. The Claremont Unified School District serves a small section of northern Pomona. Residents there are zoned to Sumner Elementary School, El Roble Intermediate School, and Claremont High School.

The School of Arts and Enterprise, a charter high school, is also located in the city.

There are four parochial schools of the Roman Catholic Archdiocese of Los Angeles located in Pomona: St. Madeleine Catholic School (K-5), St. Joseph Elementary School (K–5), Pomona Catholic Middle School and High School and St. Christopher-Joseph-Aquinas Academic Academy (2 locations). There are also three Islamic schools: New Dimensions School (K-8), ICC Community School (K-8) and City of Knowledge (K-12).

Colleges and universities

California State Polytechnic University, Pomona (Cal Poly Pomona) is located southwest of the junction of the 10 and 57 freeways. The university was established on the site of breakfast cereal magnate W.K. Kellogg's ranch located on the city's western corner. The university is known for its agricultural, hospitality, engineering and architectural programs. Some campus areas are also located in Walnut, and the unincorporated community of Ramona. 
Western University of Health Sciences, (formerly known as College of Osteopathic Medicine of the Pacific) is located south of Highway 10 off Towne Avenue. It is one of the largest health sciences universities in California. 
Laguna Technical College is also located in downtown Pomona

Nearby
Pomona College was founded in Pomona in 1887, but moved to neighboring Claremont, California in 1889. It is now part of the Claremont Colleges.
Mt. San Antonio College, located in Walnut, California, is adjacent to Cal Poly Pomona, west of the 57 Freeway.

Media

The major daily newspaper in the area is Inland Valley Daily Bulletin. La Opinión is the city's major Spanish-language paper. There are also a wide variety of smaller regional newspapers, alternative weeklies and magazines, including:
 Claremont Courier
 San Gabriel Valley Tribune
 Proud Digital Media (aka Pomona Proud) with a local audience 60,000+

Infrastructure

Rail

Pomona is connected to downtown Los Angeles and to downtown Riverside via Metrolink and is connected by Amtrak via the Sunset Limited and the Texas Eagle. In addition, Pomona will be connected to Los Angeles and eastern Los Angeles county via light rail when the Gold Line Foothill Extension is completed in 2026. When it opens, the rail line will be renamed the A Line per Metro's new naming convention, and it will connect with the former Blue Line via the new Regional Connector in downtown Los Angeles.

Metrolink stations
: Pomona—Downtown
: Pomona—North

Freeways and highways
 San Bernardino Freeway
 Orange Freeway
 Pomona Freeway
 Foothill Boulevard
 Chino Valley Freeway

Airports
Pomona is serviced by:
Hollywood Burbank Airport (BUR), located in Burbank, away

Buses
Pomona is served by Foothill Transit. The Silver Streak is Foothill Transit's bus rapid transit line operating between eastbound to Montclair and westbound to Downtown Los Angeles. Omnitrans bus line 61 runs throughout downtown Pomona.

The service runs much more frequently than other area mass transit, and operates around the clock. 60-foot NABI articulated buses are used on this route, similar to those used on the Metro G Line, Metro Local, and Metro Rapid.

Notable people

Above the Law, rap group, formed in Pomona
Jessica Alba, actress and entrepreneur, born in Pomona
Richard Armour, author, grew up in Pomona and attended Pomona College
Milton L. Banks, basketball player for the Harlem Globetrotters, raised in Pomona
Guy Vernon Bennett, politician, was superintendent of schools in Pomona in 1914
Jeanne Black, country singer, born in Pomona
Ron Burkle
Buckethead, musician, songwriter, and multi-instrumentalist
Jim Chandler, author, spent time in Pomona during his youth
Dan Cortes, professional baseball player
Alberto Davila, boxer
Gabriel P. Disosway, United States Air Force General
Michael Efevberha, basketball player for the Nigeria national basketball team
Ron English, football coach
Al Ferguson, actor
Todd Field, actor and film director
Mike Frank, baseball player
Suga Free, rapper
Britney Gallivan, best known for debunking a myth about paper folding
Ben Harper, singer-songwriter, born in Pomona
Donnie Hill, professional baseball player
Bruce Hines, baseball coach
Jim Keith, author
Will Keith Kellogg, industrialist
Jill Kelly, pornographic actress
Kokane, rapper, actor
Dan McGwire, football player
Mark McGwire, Major League Baseball player and coach
Daniel Keys Moran, science fiction author
Cameron Morrah, football player
"Sugar" Shane Mosley, professional boxer
Ed Nelson, actor
Kem Nunn, author, surfer
Ryan O'Donohue, voice actor
Moriah Peters, Christian musician
Orlando Perez, Major League Soccer player
Louis Phillips (rancher) original owner of much of the land that is now Pomona and the richest man in Los Angeles County
Kenneth Pitzer, chemist, Stanford University president
Russell K. Pitzer, philanthropist, founder of Pitzer College
Dave Rice, basketball player and head coach, UNLV
Frank "Cannonball" Richards, carnival and vaudeville performer, buried at the Pomona Cemetery
Richie Sandoval, boxer
Bob Seagren, pole vaulter, Olympic gold and silver medalist, started vaulting as a teenager in Pomona
Millard Sheets, artist and Scripps College professor
Bill Singer, Major League Baseball pitcher
Keith Smith, fullback for the Atlanta Falcons
Noah Song, professional baseball player
Randy Stein, baseball player
Brian Stokes, baseball pitcher
James Tarjan, Chess Grandmaster
Robert Tarjan, computer scientist, born in Pomona
Steve Thomas, author, television personality
Pat Toomay, former football player
Norma Torres, congresswoman and mayor of Pomona
Rik Van Nutter, actor
Jimmy Verdon, football player and coach
Edward Ulloa, attorney and former prosecutor
Tom Waits, singer-songwriter, composer, and actor
Delanie Walker, professional football player
Frank Wilcox, actor, lived in Pomona in the 1930s and worked in lemon groves
Rozz Williams, gothic rock musician, born in Pomona
Larry Wilmore, comedian and comedy writer, host of The Nightly Show
Trevor Wright, actor
Rich Yett, professional baseball player, born in Pomona
The Hughes Brothers, film directors known for Menace II Society, Dead Presidents and The Book of Eli
Alejandro Aranda, singer and songwriter, runner-up on the seventeenth season of American Idol, born in Pomona.
Sinqua Walls, basketball player for Cal Poly Pomona
Ryan Perry, baseball pitcher
Chris Miller, football coach
Kaleena Mosqueda-Lewis, basketball player born in Pomona
Jerry Green, basketball player
Marty Keough, baseball player
Dedrique Taylor, basketball head coach 

In popular culture

 It was rumored that Walt Disney originally planned on having Disneyland built in Pomona, but the city council declined his offer, fearing that the park would not succeed and would cause the city to go into debt. According to a reporter for the Inland Valley Daily Bulletin, David Allen, his former colleague, Matthew Tresaugue had reported, in a 1997 story, that Pomona was merely one of 71 considered cities, but was ruled out due to temperature extremes, i.e. too hot in the summer and too cold at night. Author James Ellroy used Pomona as the setting for the fictional amusement park Dream-a-Dreamland in his novel L.A. Confidential. Dream-a-Dreamland and its fictional owner, the cartoon magnate Ray Dieterling, were based very closely on Disneyland and Walt Disney.
 In an episode of I Love Lucy, the main characters of the show "go out to the country" on a day trip to Pomona. This is now seen as odd due to Pomona having since become quite urban. In 1940, Lucille Ball and Desi Arnaz spent their honeymoon in downtown Pomona.
 The Fox Theater in Pomona was frequently used by Hollywood during the Golden Age for test screenings. In Sunset Blvd. (Billy Wilder, 1950) when Norma Desmond, played by Gloria Swanson, reads a script to Joe Gillis (William Holden), Gillis comments: "They'll love it in Pomona".
 The 1979 Steven Spielberg film 1941 is partly set in Pomona.
 The 2003 film adaptation of The Cat in the Hat'', starring Mike Myers, transforms Pomona's Antique Row into a scene straight from the imagination of Dr. Seuss.

See also

Pomona Valley
Phillips Ranch
List of Mexican-American communities
List of U.S. cities with large Hispanic populations

References

External links
 

Pomona Unified School District
Pomona Local News
Pomona Chamber of Commerce
City-Data.com Comprehensive Statistical Data and more about Pomona

 
Cities in Los Angeles County, California
Incorporated cities and towns in California
Populated places established in the 1830s
1888 establishments in California
Chicano and Mexican neighborhoods in California